The Nepal house martin (Delichon nipalense) is a non-migratory passerine of the swallow family Hirundinidae. Its two subspecies breed in the Himalayas from northwestern India through Nepal to Myanmar, northern Vietnam, and just into China. It occurs in river valleys and rugged wooded mountain ridges at heights between  altitude, where it nests in colonies beneath overhangs on vertical cliffs, laying three or four white eggs in an enclosed mud nest.

This martin has blue-black upperparts with a contrasting white rump, and white underparts. It resembles its close relatives, the Asian house martin and common house martin, but unlike those species it has a black throat and black undertail. It feeds in flocks with other swallows, catching flies and other insects in flight. It is subject to predation and parasites, but its status within its limited range appears secure.

Taxonomy
The Nepal house martin was first described by British entomologist Frederic Moore in 1854, and placed in a new genus Delichon created by Moore and American naturalist Thomas Horsfield. The specimen or its description was attributed by Moore to Brian Houghton Hodgson and early literature sometimes refers to it as Hodgson's martin. Some older taxonomic sources such as those by S D Ripley specify the binomial author as "Hodgson = Moore in Horsfield & Moore, 1854". Its closest relatives are the two other members of the genus, the Asian house martin and the common house martin. This martin has a distinctive subspecies, D. n. cuttingi, described by American biologist Ernst W. Mayr in 1941 from a specimen taken near the Burma-Yunnan border. White-throated birds in the southern extension of the range are similar in appearance to the nominate subspecies, but because of their geographical separation are sometimes considered to be a third race, D. n. bartletti.
Delichon is an anagram of the Ancient Greek term χελιδών (chelīdōn), meaning "swallow", and nipalense refers to Nepal, where the type specimen was obtained.

Distribution and habitat
The nominate subspecies D. n. nipalense breeds in the Himalayas from Garhwal east through Nepal, north-eastern India and Bangladesh as far as western Myanmar. The race D. n. cuttingi is found in northern Myanmar, along Myanmar's border with Chinese Yunnan and in northern Tonkin, Vietnam. The Nepal house martin is largely resident, but may move to lower altitudes when not breeding, and has been occasionally recorded in northern Thailand in winter. The range in Thailand is poorly known.

The habitat is river valleys and wooded ridges at  altitude, although mainly below . The range of this species overlaps with that of the nominate subspecies of Asian house martin, although they breed at different altitudes. The height separation and the small differences in appearance seem sufficient to prevent interbreeding.

Description
It has a contrasting pure white rump, the tail and upperwings are brownish-black, and the underwings are grey-brown. The legs and feet are brownish-pink and covered with white feathers, the eyes are brown, and the bill is black. The chin is black but the extent varies clinally. In the northeast of the range, birds of the race D. n. cuttingi have black on the whole of the throat and the uppermost breast, but further west or south the black increasingly becomes restricted to the chin. There are no differences in appearance between the sexes, but the juvenile bird is less glossy and has a duskier throat and buff-washed underparts.

Both subspecies can be distinguished from the similar Asian and common house martins by their black chin, black undertail coverts and much squarer tail.

This is an exceptionally fast-flying martin which gives an occasional short chi-i call in flight. It is otherwise a rather quiet bird, but it has a brief three-note breeding song.

Behaviour

Breeding
The Nepal house martin breeds between March and July, with some variation in timing depending on locality, and usually raises two broods. It normally builds its nest, a deep mud bowl lined with grasses or feathers, under an overhang on a vertical cliff. Very occasionally, buildings may be used as nest sites, and in Sikkim this bird is recorded as nesting under school roofs near the Fambong Lho Wildlife Sanctuary. This martin is a colonial breeder, with colonies sometimes containing hundreds of nests. Some birds may remain at the colonies throughout the year, using the nests as a winter roost. The normal clutch is three or four plain white eggs averaging  and weighing . The incubation and fledging times are unknown, but are probably similar to those of the common house martin, which has an incubation period of 14–16 days until the eggs hatch, and a further 22–32 days to fledging. Both sexes build the nest, incubate the eggs and feed the chicks.

Feeding
The Nepal house martin feeds on insects taken in flight, hunting along ridges or above treetops. The diet is not well known, but includes flies. This bird is gregarious, feeding in flocks often with other aerial predators like the Himalayan swiftlet, or other hirundines such as the barn swallow, striated swallow or common house martin.

Predators and parasites
Predators of this martin have been little studied, but it was the only bird recorded in a study of the diet of the mainly insectivorous collared falconet. It is parasitised by a flea of the genus  Callopsylla.

Conservation status
The Nepal house martin has a large range that does not appear to be contracting, and its numbers appear to be stable, although the population is unknown. Although often localised due to the requirement for suitable cliff nesting sites, this species is fairly common in Nepal as a whole, and very common in some regions. However, some earlier authors have noted this species as uncommon in Nepal.

References

External links

Photograph at the Internet Bird Collection

Nepal house martin
Birds of Eastern Himalaya
Birds of Myanmar
Birds of Nepal
Birds of Yunnan
Nepal house martin
Taxa named by Frederic Moore